= T.Agaram =

Thirumalai Agaram
- Location in Tamil Nadu

Religion
- Affiliation: Hinduism
- District: Cuddalore
- Deity: Sudarkozhundisar, Pralayakaleshwara(Shiva), Kadanthai Nayaki, Amodhana Ambikai

Location
- Location: Tamil Nadu, India
- State: Tamil Nadu
- Country: India
- Interactive map of Thirumalai Agaram
- Coordinates: 11°42′0″N 79°23′0″E

Architecture
- Type: Dravidian architecture

Thiru malai Agaram is an area in north Chennai in India.

T.Agaram is located 1 km from Pennadam towards North Direction rich in production of Sugarcane, Paddy and Dairy. T.Agaram is divided into east and west. Casteist Hindu Dwell in T. Agaram East & Scheduled Caste People dwell in T. Agaram West. T.Agaram is a cultural and traditional village.

== Temples ==
One ancient Sivan temple is located at T.Agaram "Veeranar temple located in the east guarding the village from evils" "The primary school in the village was donated to the Tamilnadu government by Nallasiriyar Chinnasamy padayachi"

Shri Sudarkozhundeesar temple of Pennadam/T.Agaram

The Shiva temple in the village of Pennadam or Pennagadam in Tamil Nadu, India, is the shrine of Sudarkozhundisar or Kadanthai Nathar. The Shiva here is also known as Pralayakaleshwara. His consort is known as Kadanthai Nayaki and Amodhana Ambikai. Because its mythology connects it with the events of the Great Flood.

Like many of the ancient temples it is known by several names, like Tungaanai Maadam and Kadanthai. According to the inscriptions found in this temple it is one of 78 shrines build by the legendary Chola king Kocengannan. This king is only known from legends and Tamil texts from the Sangam age (approximately the centuries just before and after CE). The main shrine belongs architecturally to the Early Chola period. It is a vimana (garbhagriha=sanctum plus the roof) in the form of an elephant’s back which is called a Gajapristhakara. Normally in South Indian shrines the vehicle of a deity (which is a symbol of the deity) faces towards the sanctum. Here the sacred bull Nandi, the vehicle of Shiva here called Prathosha Nandidevar or Adikara-Nandi, faces away from the sanctum. The myth of the temple (the sthala purana) tells that when the primordial flood was about to wipe away Pennadam Shiva instructed Nandi to turn around and swallow all the water, thus saving the temple and the people of this place. Other mythological figures connected with this temple are Kamadhenu, the wishing cow, Airavatha, the elephant vehicle of Indra, king of the gods. It is also associated with the act of Shiva swallowing the poison which came up from the Milky Ocean when it was churned by the Devas and Asuras. A subsidiary shrine dedicated to Shiva as Javanteeswarar has been built on an artificial hill. A hundred steps lead to the top.
